Joy-Con are the primary game controllers for the Nintendo Switch video game console. They consist of two individual units, each containing an analog stick and an array of buttons. They can be used while attached to the main Nintendo Switch console unit, or detached and used wirelessly; when detached, a pair of Joy-Con can be used by a single player, or divided between two as individual controllers. The controllers have been criticized for the tendency of the analog sticks to register inputs when not being touched (also known as drift).

Design 

Joy-Con are distributed in pairs, designated as "Joy-Con L" and "Joy-Con R" respectively.

Joy-Con can be attached to the sides of the Switch console via rails, or detached and used wirelessly—either as a pair (comparable to a Wii Remote and Nunchuk), or divided between two different players. Up to 8 Joy-Con can connect to a single Switch console at a time. The Joy-Con can be optionally attached to a "Joy-Con Grip" accessory, with or without charging capabilities, that convert the controllers to a more traditional gamepad-like form factor.

When detached from the console, both Joy-Con units operate autonomously of each other, and communicate with the console via Bluetooth. Wrist strap attachments are provided, which are similarly installed by sliding them onto the controllers' rails. The strap attachments have a rounded shape and raised shoulder buttons to improve the ergonomics of the Joy-Con when used individually.

Joy-Con contain non-removable 3.7 volt 525 mAh 1.9 watt hour lithium-ion polymer batteries; they are charged when attached to a Switch console that itself is charging. A separate "charging grip" accessory allows the controllers to be charged in a gamepad configuration via USB-C. Nintendo released a Joy-Con AA battery pack attachment on June 16, 2017, which slide onto the Joy-Con similarly to the wrist strap attachments.

Colors and variations 

Joy-Con can be obtained in various colors, either with the purchase of the Switch console or individually, both separately or as a pair. At launch, Joy-Con were available in slate gray, neon red R and neon blue L colors. Black Joy-Con are also issued with Switch development kits. In mid-2017, Nintendo introduced neon yellow Joy-Con, released alongside Arms as well as neon green and neon pink Joy-Con which launched alongside Splatoon 2. A pair of red Joy-Con were released as part of the Super Mario Odyssey bundle, except in Japan and Europe (My Nintendo Store only) where they are available standalone, which was released in October 2017. An exclusive Nintendo Labo Joy-Con design, light brown in color, was released in 2018. It was exclusively available to winners of the Nintendo Labo Creators Contest. In July 2018, Hori, a video game peripheral company, released a dark blue left Joy-Con featuring a classic D-pad in lieu of directional buttons. The controller lacked features such as HD rumble, SL and SR buttons, gyroscope, and wireless connectivity standard to Nintendo-produced Joy-Con, forcing its users to be restricted to handheld mode. This was notably the first officially licensed Joy-Con to be released by a third-party company. Two more officially licensed D-pad variants featuring The Legend of Zelda: Breath of the Wild and Super Mario Odyssey themes were later released by Hori in September 2018. Joy-Con colors based on Eevee and Pikachu's color schemes were released alongside Pokémon: Let's Go, Pikachu! and Let's Go, Eevee! on November 16, 2018, as part of the Switch bundle for the games, and Hori released a fourth D-pad Joy-Con variant featuring a Pikachu theme on the same day. Gray Joy-Con variants featuring a silver Super Smash Bros. series cross logo became available for pre-order alongside Super Smash Bros. Ultimate on November 2, 2018, and were later released on December 7, 2018, as part of the Super Smash Bros. Ultimate Switch bundle. In July 2019, Nintendo announced that the neon purple and neon orange Joy-Con would be released on October 4, 2019, as well as the blue and neon yellow Joy-Con. Ultramarine blue Joy-Con launched alongside Dragon Quest XI S in Japan on September 27, 2019, as part of the Dragon Quest XI S Loto Edition Switch bundle. Pink and mulberry Tsum Tsum Joy-Con launched alongside Disney Tsum Tsum Festival in Japan on October 10, 2019, as part of the Disney Tsum Tsum Festival Switch bundle. Gray Joy-Con variants with a thunderbolt symbol on the left and a Pikachu silhouette on the right were released in Japan on November 29, 2019, as part of the Thunderbolt Project Switch bundle. Medium aquamarine and sky blue Joy-Con became available for pre-order alongside Animal Crossing: New Horizons on March 13, 2020, and were later released on March 20, 2020, as part of the Animal Crossing: New Horizons Switch bundle. Sunglow yellow and French blue Joy-Con were released as part of two Fortnite bundles; the sunglow yellow Joy-Con L and French blue Joy-Con R were released on October 6, 2020 in Europe and November 6, 2020 in Australia and New Zealand as part of the Fortnite special edition Switch bundle, and the French blue Joy-Con L and sunglow yellow Joy-Con R were released as part of the Fortnite - Fleet Force bundle on June 4, 2021. Red Mario Joy-Con launched on January 12, 2021, as part of the Mario Red & Blue Edition-themed Switch bundle. Gray Joy-Con variants featuring silver and gold Monster Hunter Rise artwork were released on March 26, 2021, as part of the Monster Hunter Rise Switch bundle. A blue Joy-Con pair themed after the Master Sword and Hylian Shield from The Legend of Zelda: Skyward Sword HD was released alongside the game on July 16, 2021. White Joy-Con were released on October 8, 2021, as part of the white Nintendo Switch – OLED Model bundle. Blue and neon yellow Joy-Con variants with artwork themed after Splatoon 3 became available to pre-order alongside Splatoon 3 on August 26, 2022, and were later released on September 9, 2022, as part of the Splatoon 3 Switch – OLED Model bundle. Dark red and purple Joy-Con variants with artwork themed after Pokémon Scarlet and Violet were available to pre-order alongside Pokémon Scarlet and Violet on November 4, 2022, and were later released on November 18, 2022, as part of the Pokémon Scarlet and Violet Switch – OLED Model bundle.

In December 2018, Nintendo also released two Joy-Con variants with designs resembling classic Nintendo Entertainment System and Nintendo Famicom controllers, available exclusively to individuals with an active Nintendo Switch Online subscription. The Famicom variants were only available to Nintendo Switch Online members in Japan. These variants were designed to be used specifically with the library of classic Nintendo titles available through the Nintendo Switch Online service, as well as with select modern Switch titles. Both are notable for heavily deviating from the normal Joy-Con design, instead being taller and more rectangular in shape, having fewer buttons than standard Joy-Con, and, in the case of the Famicom variants, featuring a working microphone in the right controller. Similar Joy-Con based on both the Nintendo 64 controller as well as the 3-button Sega Genesis controller are available to Nintendo Switch Online subscribers starting in October 2021, along with a 6-button Sega Mega Drive-based Joy-Con exclusively released in Japan.

Notes
Not all colors or L/R variants are available in all regions.

Features 
The feature set of the Joy-Con was partially inspired by feedback from players using the Wii Remote, according to Nintendo's Shinya Takahashi. After releasing games that heavily used the Wii Remote with the Wii, such as Wii Sports and Wii Fit, players had asked for different design features, such as having a smaller form factor, or being able to be strapped to a part of the body. Nintendo envisioned what benefits towards innovative design and gameplay could come from a smaller form factor, which led to the idea of a console that could be portable, controlled through these smaller controllers. This became the fundamental principle of the Switch, and directly into the Joy-Con design.

In an update released on October 18, 2017, the screenshot button is also able to record up to 30 seconds of gameplay in select games when held down for a second.

Each Joy-Con contains an accelerometer and gyroscope, which can be used for motion tracking. Games can support using the Joy-Con for pointing controls similar to the Wii Remote while detached without the need of a sensor bar. Joy-Con R contains an infrared depth tracking sensor, which can read objects and motions held in front of it; as an example of its functionality, Nintendo stated that the sensor could distinguish between the hand shapes of rock–paper–scissors. Joy-Con R also contains a near-field communication reader for use with Amiibo.

The Joy-Con contain a haptic feedback engine known as "HD Rumble", which was developed in partnership with Immersion Corporation. Nintendo stated that the system could generate fine tactile feedback, such as the sensation of individual ice cubes and water in a glass.

Other platforms 
It was discovered shortly after public release that Joy-Con can connect to and be used with other Bluetooth-enabled personal computers and mobile devices. Official Joy-Con support was also added to iPhones and iPads as part of its iOS 16 update.

Reception

Technical issues 
Prior to the public release of Nintendo Switch, various video gaming websites reported that the controllers—most commonly the Joy-Con L—were susceptible to connection losses when used wirelessly. It was initially unknown whether these problems were the result of an interference issue, or caused by the pre-launch software on review units. A Nintendo spokesperson stated to Polygon that the company would "continue to monitor the performance of Nintendo Switch hardware and software, and make improvements when necessary". The company posted guidance on its support website for minimizing Bluetooth signal interference, including recommendations that the Switch console be placed away from other wireless-enabled devices. On March 22, 2017, Nintendo confirmed that the interference issues were caused by a "manufacturing variant" in a small number of Joy-Con from early production runs, and that the company would allow owners to send in their affected Joy-Con for repairs free-of-charge.

On launch, it was reported that the wrist strap attachments for the Joy-Con were hard to detach from the controllers. It was also reported that a wrist strap could easily be attached to the Joy-Con incorrectly and become difficult to remove.

One of the more common issues to be found with the Joy-Con is joystick drift. This issue occurs when dust or other small particles come in contact with the internal sensors of the analog stick. A common remedy for this issue is to apply compressed air or contact cleaner under the rubber skirt of the joystick. Nintendo repairs this issue for free if under warranty, but the cost of repair for an out of warranty Joy-Con could be over 40 United States dollars according to many reports on the topic. The high price of repair leads many to buy an entirely new Joy-Con as they only cost slightly more than a repair, a single being $49.99 and a set of two $79.99. In response to increased complaints and potential legal action for the drift issue, Nintendo stated that they were aware of the frequent reports, but did not offer immediate advice outside of contacting their technical support lines. On July 23, 2019, three days after the filing of a class action lawsuit, an internal Nintendo memo was leaked; the memo instructed the firm's customer service employees in North America to start offering repairs for drifting Joy-Con controllers for free, regardless of warranty status.

Nintendo president Shuntaro Furukawa issued a public apology from the company for the drift problem as part of an investors' meeting in June 2020, stating "We apologize for any inconvenience caused to our customers regarding Joy-Con controllers. We are continuing to improve our products", but could not comment further due to ongoing legal cases related to the controllers.

With the release of the OLED revision of the Switch in October 2021, Nintendo said that the new Joy-Con design should reduce the drift problem but they did not expect that they could ever eliminate the drift as it is an issue related to wear from long-term usage. The new design of the joysticks in the OLED Joy-Con were made to reduce how much wear occurs to make them more durable but the company still anticipates drifting could still occur.

Legal issues

Patent challenge
In August 2017, Los Angeles-based tablet peripheral manufacturer Gamevice filed a lawsuit against Nintendo in the United States District Court for the Central District of California, alleging that the design of the Joy-Con controllers conflicts with its patent on the design for the Wikipad, an Android-based gaming device that also features a tablet with a detachable controller. The lawsuit sought damages on existing Switch sales and banning further sales of the console. The lawsuit was voluntarily dismissed by Gamevice on October 23, 2017.

However, in March 2018, Gamevice initiated a second patent infringement lawsuit on Nintendo related to a different set of patents. Gamevice also sought action through the United States International Trade Commission related to patent infringement under Section 337 of the Tariff Act of 1930, and was seeking to block imports of the Switch into the United States.

Joy-Con drift lawsuits
Two class action lawsuits were filed in the United States District Court for the Western District of Washington in July 2019 and September 2019 over the Joy-Con drift issue. The first suit alleges that Nintendo is well aware of the defect but does not "disclose the defect and routinely refuses to repair the joysticks without charge"; the second suit alleges that the Joy-Con controllers are defective. It asserts claims for breach of warranty, fraud, and violations of numerous state consumer protection statutes. The court refused to dismiss the suits, and as of October 2020, are currently under arbitration hearings.

Two additional class action lawsuits were filed in October and November 2020 in the United States, respectively in the Northern California District Court and in the Western Washington District Court. Both suits allege Nintendo of having defective manufacturing processes for the Joy-Con, even after the company apologized for the problem, as the primary clients in both cases has purchased multiple Joy-Con but found the drift occurred over time in each set purchased. At least one of the lawsuits was dismissed in February 2023, as the judge ruled that the EULA for the Nintendo Switch required users to go through arbitration instead of lawsuits to resolve matters.

The French consumer group UFC-Que Choisir filed a lawsuit against Nintendo in September 2020 alleging that the Joy-Con were designed with planned obsolescence intended to fail or break due to the drift issue and other factors. The suit seeks to compel Nintendo to change its manufacturing process to improve the durability of the Joy-Con.

A consortium of nine European consumer organizations requested consumers inform them on Joy-Con drift issues in December 2020 as they negotiated with Nintendo on how to resolve the matters in that region. The organizations stated that they would plan legal action if they could not come to an agreement with Nintendo. The European Consumer Organisation (BEUC), which represents 40 consumers groups in the region, also urged the European Commission to investigate the Joy-Con drift issue in January 2021 after the body received 25,000 complaints.

Footnotes

References 

Gesture recognition
Nintendo controllers
Nintendo Switch
Nintendo Switch accessories